Field Township is one of sixteen townships in Jefferson County, Illinois, USA.  As of the 2010 census, its population was 1,468 and it contained 637 housing units.

Geography
The townshop is centered at 38°26′N 88°52′W (38.433,-88.867).

Unincorporated towns
 Divide at 
 Texico at 
(This list is based on USGS data and may include former settlements.)

Adjacent townships
 Haines Township, Marion County (north)
 Farrington Township (east)
 Webber Township (southeast)
 Mt. Vernon Township (south)
 Shiloh Township (southwest)
 Rome Township (west)
 Raccoon Township, Marion County (northwest)

Cemeteries
The township contains these eight cemeteries: Antioch, Hall, Hickey, Jordan Chapel, Oak Grove, Old Panther Fork, Panther Fork and Union Chapel.

Lakes
 Miller Lake

Demographics

Political districts
 Illinois' 19th congressional district
 State House District 107
 State Senate District 54

References
 
 United States Census Bureau 2007 TIGER/Line Shapefiles
 United States National Atlas

External links
 City-Data.com
 Illinois State Archives

Townships in Jefferson County, Illinois
Mount Vernon, Illinois micropolitan area
Townships in Illinois